Nonnweiler is a municipality in the district of Sankt Wendel, in Saarland, Germany.

Overview
It is situated approximately 20 km northwest of Sankt Wendel, and 30 km southeast of Trier. The village is well known for the "Hillfort of Otzenhausen", a huge wall (former castle) of Celtic origin.

References

External links

Municipalities in Saarland
Sankt Wendel (district)